Béla Egresi (born in Csepel on 11 May 1922 – died in Budapest on 10 June 1999) was a Hungarian football forward, who played for Kispest and Újpest FC, as well as representing 23 times the Hungarian national football team between 1943 and 1953. He was a member of the Hungarian Golden Team.

External links
 Player profile at sportmuzeum.hu 

1922 births
1999 deaths
Hungarian footballers
Hungary international footballers
Újpest FC players
Burials at Farkasréti Cemetery
Footballers from Budapest
Association football forwards